Rao Muhammad Afzal Khan, 
(born in 1925 in Kalanaur Punjab Province, now in Haryana Punjab province, British India – 12 May 1992) was a politician in Pakistan. In 1952, he was elected as MPA from Sahiwal District Tehsil Depalpur. He went on to win election an additional four times as Member of the Provincial Assembly and twice as a Member of the National Assembly in 1985 and 1988.

Biography
In 1952, Khan was elected MPA for Sahiwal District. He was re-elected to this position on four occasions. In 1970 he was the only member of the Provincial Assembly of Punjab in the Sahiwal District to win election against Zulfikar Ali Bhutto's party, the Pakistan Peoples Party (PPP). As a result of this, Bhutto visited Khan to request he join the PPP, which Khan did. Khan then ran for election in 1988 against Nawaz Sharif and won the election by a large margin.

References 

Pakistani politicians
1925 births
1998 deaths
Rao family
Pakistani people of Haryanvi descent
Punjabi people